Sister Bay is a village in Door County, Wisconsin, United States. The population was 876 at the 2010 census.

Geography

Demographics

2000 census 
At the 2000 census, there were 886 people, 446 households and 224 families living in the village. The population density was 341.9 per square mile (132.1/km2). There were 945 housing units at an average density of 364.7 per square mile (140.9/km2). The racial makeup of the village was 98.42% White, 0.11% African American, 0.79% Native American, 0.23% Asian, 0.11% from other races, and 0.34% from two or more races. Hispanic or Latino of any race were 0.68% of the population.

There were 446 households, of which 11.4% had children under the age of 18 living with them, 46.0% were married couples living together, 3.6% had a female householder with no husband present, and 49.6% were non-families. 46.4% of all households were made up of individuals, and 28.7% had someone living alone who was 65 years of age or older. The average household size was 1.78 and the average family size was 2.45.

10.9% of the population were under the age of 18, 3.7% from 18 to 24, 13.4% from 25 to 44, 25.7% from 45 to 64, and 46.2% who were 65 years of age or older. The median age was 61 years. For every 100 females, there were 73.7 males. For every 100 females age 18 and over, there were 69.0 males.

The median household income was $33,224 and the median family income was $50,893. Males had a median income of $28,571 compared with $23,250 for females. The per capita income for the village was $25,029. About 1.4% of families and 3.5% of the population were below the poverty line, including none of those under age 18 and 3.6% of those age 65 or over.

2010 census 
At the 2010 census, there were 876 people, 457 households and 217 families living in the village. The racial makeup of the village was 97.5% White, 0.7% African American, 0.1% Native American, 0.2% Asian, 1.0% from other races, and 0.5% from two or more races. Hispanic or Latino residents of any race were 3.1% of the population.

There were 457 households, of which 11.2% had children under the age of 18 living with them, 40.3% were married couples living together, 5.0% had a female householder with no husband present, 2.2% had a male householder with no wife present, and 52.5% were non-families. 47.3% of all households were made up of individuals, and 29.7% had someone living alone who was 65 years of age or older. The average household size was 1.75 and the average family size was 2.43.

The median age in the village was 62.7 years. 10.3% of residents were under the age of 18; 3.2% were between the ages of 18 and 24; 15% were from 25 to 44; 25.3% were from 45 to 64; and 46.2% were 65 years of age or older. The gender makeup of the village was 42.9% male and 57.1% female.

Education
Gibraltar Area Schools serves the community. Gibraltar Elementary School and Gibraltar Secondary School are the two schools.

Historical landmarks
Jischke's Meat Market
Al Johnson's Swedish Restaurant
The shipwreck site of the Meridian, a schooner that sank in 1873, is located off the coast of Sister Bay south of the Sister Islands.
Country House Resort, was the first homestead in Sister Bay, Door County, Wisconsin. The Town of Liberty Grove was established at a meeting on this property in 1859.

Transportation

State highways 

  WIS 42 northbound travels to Ellison Bay, and Gills Rock, while southbound travels to Ephraim, Sturgeon Bay, and Manitowoc, where it connects to I-43.
  WIS 57 terminates in Sister Bay; southbound travels to Sturgeon Bay and Green Bay, where it connects to I-43.

Climate

Images

References

External links

Villages in Door County, Wisconsin
Villages in Wisconsin